Natalia Romero Franco (born 17 November 1988) is a Spanish runner. She is a multiple time national champion over 400m and 800m.

Career

Romero was a 400 metres runner, and a double national champion indoors over 400m, who retrained as an 800 metres runner under the guidance of Pedro Jiménez, a professor of sports training methodology at the Rey Juan Carlos University in Madrid. Romero then won the Spanish national championship 800 metres in 2019, and 2021.

She competed in the Athletics at the 2020 Summer Olympics – Women's 800 metres running a personal best of 2:01.16 in heat 6 to qualify for the semi-final. In the semi-final, Romero ran just outside that for a time or 2:01.52, finishing eighth.

Personal life
A trained physiotherapist, and a lecturer in physiotherapy at the University of the Balearic Islands, Romero was named University Sportswoman of the Year in Spain in 2009. Romero was diagnosed with plantar fasciitis due to excessive use of a treadmill during the COVID-19 lockdown.

References

External links
 
 
 
 

1988 births
Living people
Spanish female middle-distance runners
Olympic athletes of Spain
Athletes (track and field) at the 2020 Summer Olympics
20th-century Spanish women
21st-century Spanish women